Steiniella may refer to:
 Steiniella, a genus of algae in the family Gonyaulacaceae; synonym of Gonyaulax
 Steiniella C.Bernard, 1908, nom. illeg., a genus of algae in the family Scenedesmaceae; replaced by Steinedesmus